Double Threat: Canadian Jews, the Military, and World War II is a 2018 book by Ellin Bessner.

Background 
Bessner was inspired to explore the role of Canadian Jews in the war effort by the words: "He died so Jewry should suffer no more" on a Canadian Jewish soldier's tombstone in Normandy.

Overview 
It focuses particularly on the 17,000 Canadian Jew that enlisted, of whom 450 did not survive the war.

The soldiers faced a "double threat"– they were not only fighting against Fascism but for Jewish survival. At the same time, they encountered widespread antisemitism and the danger of being identified as Jews if captured. The title of the book comes from a letter written by Canada's Prime Minister during the war, William Lyon MacKenzie King, thanking the Jewish community for their efforts during the War and how they faced a "double threat" of both Nazi aggression and the survival of the Jewish nation.

The author conducted hundreds of interviews and extensive archival research to paint a complex picture.

Reception 
It was featured in the Montreal Gazette; highly praised in the Hamilton Jewish News; called ‘excellent’ by University of Western Ontario women's studies professor; the Canadian Jewish News compared it to classics: None Is Too Many (Irving Abella-Harold Troper) and Canada’s Jews: A People’s Journey, (Gerald J. J. Tulchinsky); and titled "Heroes from north of the border!" in both the Long Island Jewish World and the Manhattan Jewish Sentinel. It was also reviewed by Jennifer Shaw in the journal Canadian Jewish Studies.

About the author 
Ellin Bessner was born and raised in Montreal, Canada. She used to skate at Mount Royal before heading to Ottawa to study.
She graduated with a degree in journalism and political science from Carleton University. As a journalist, she worked for CTV News and CBC News, which took her not only in Canada but around the world, as well as stringing for the Globe and Mail, The Canadian Press at al. In the 1990s Ellin also covered several civil wars in Africa. Among personalities she interviewed, Prince Philip and the Dalai Lama.

Bibliography 

 Ellin Bessner, Double Threat: Canadian Jews, the Military, and World War II, (Toronto: New Jewish Press, 2018), 358 pp., .

See also
 Canada in World War II
 None Is Too Many

References 

World War 02
Jewish resistance during the Holocaust
Jewish Canadian history
Canadian Armed Forces
History books about World War II